Lonely Just Like Me is the third studio album by the American soul musician Arthur Alexander, released in 1993. It was Alexander's first album in 21 years. He died shortly after its release.

The album was reissued in 2007, with additional tracks that had been recorded for NPR.

Production
The album was produced by Ben Vaughn and Thomas Cain, as part of Elektra/Nonesuch's "American Explorer" album series. Some songs for the album were demoed in a hotel room in Cleveland; Alexander had been working as a bus driver in the city. Donnie Fritts, who had worked with Alexander during his Muscle Shoals days, cowrote a few songs; Muscle Shoals alumni Spooner Oldham and Dan Penn played on the album. It was recorded in Nashville.

Critical reception

The Chicago Tribune called the album "one of the finest examples of [the country soul] sound to appear since the Muscle Shoals heyday." The Orlando Sentinel wrote: "On the heartbroken yet resilient 'All the Time', Alexander makes 'do-doodaly-doo' sound like the saddest syllables in the world—next to his words: 'If they took apart my heart/ just to see what they could see/ well they'd see misery/ where you keep hurting me'." The Globe and Mail deemed it "a wistful, graceful take on classic soul that shows off Alexander's skills both as a songwriter and as a singer."

(The New) Rolling Stone Album Guide praised the "surprisingly emotional new material."

Track listing

References

Arthur Alexander albums
1993 albums